Nightingales is an American medical drama television series that aired on NBC from January 21 to April 26, 1989. It was produced by Aaron Spelling Productions.

Premise
The series follows the stories of Christine Broderick, a supervisor of student nurses, portrayed by Suzanne Pleshette, and her five nursing students: Sam, Bridget, Yolanda, Becky, and Allyson. Other hospital personnel include Christine's love interest, Dr. Paul Petrillo; the head nurse, Lenore Ritt; and the chief of staff, Dr. Garrett Braden. Nurse Sam also has a daughter, Megan.

Cast
Suzanne Pleshette as Christine Broderick
Chelsea Field as Sam Sullivan
Kristy Swanson as Becky Granger
Susan Walters as Bridget Loring
Roxann Dawson as Yolanda Puente
Kim Johnston Ulrich as Allyson Yates
Taylor Fry as Megan Sullivan
Fran Bennett as Lenore Ritt 
Barry Newman as Dr. Garrett Braden

Episodes

Production
The series was developed from a pilot television film, also titled Nightingales, that was directed by Mimi Leder and originally aired in June 1988. Field, Walters, Swanson, Bennett, and Jennifer Rhodes (as Effie Gardner) are the only members of the cast to appear in both the film and the series.

Reception 
The series was described in the Chicago Tribune as portraying nursing students as women who "don't spend much time studying...[but] do hang around in their underwear a lot". Nightingales was criticized for "demeaning the nursing profession...by portraying five student nurses as lusty bimbos", and the American Nurses Association initiated a letter-writing campaign that prompted several of the show's sponsors to withdraw their advertising. The series was cancelled after 13 episodes. Aaron Spelling briefly revived it in syndication as the 1995 series University Hospital.

References

Sources

External links 
 
 

1989 American television series debuts
1989 American television series endings
1980s American medical television series
English-language television shows
NBC original programming
Serial drama television series
Television series by Spelling Television
Television shows set in Los Angeles